Valsa ambiens is a plant pathogen infecting elms.

See also
 List of elm diseases

References

Fungal tree pathogens and diseases
Diaporthales
Fungi described in 1801
Taxa named by Christiaan Hendrik Persoon